Brampton Island is an island in the Cumberland Group, off shore from Mackay in the Mackay Region, Queensland, Australia. The island lies within the Great Barrier Reef World Heritage Area, and the majority of the island forms the Brampton Islands National Park, however there is a resort located on the island. The highest point of the island is Brampton Peak, 214 m above sea level.

History

Early history

The traditional Aboriginal owners of Brampton Island are the Ngaro people, although no permanent population was present when Captain James Cook passed through the area in June 1770. The island was simply known as "M" in the naval charts until it was eventually given its European name in 1879, when Staff Commander Bedwell of the Royal Navy recognised the group of islands and named each after towns in the county of Cumberland. An expedition led by George Elphinstone Dalrymple landed at the island in 1860. They encountered a group of around 14 Aboriginal people with several bark canoes. These vessels were equipped with paddles decorated with red pigment as well as dugong-hunting harpoons made from palm fibre and sharpened bone.

Modern history

Settlement and the development of the resort

In 1916, Joseph Busuttin and his family became the island's first European settlers. The island's resort was first established in December 1933 when two of the Busuttin sons welcomed passengers from the P&O ship SS Canberra. Busuttin's sons then sold the resort and left in 1959.

There were several owners briefly over the next two years, Carapark and Hotels of Australia. In 1961, the island was purchased for 80,000 pounds by the McLean family which had been operating Roylen Cruises from Mackay which was started by Tom McLean MBE, a former World War II Army Engineer.

Tom McLean's son Fitzroy, who previously had been the Master of an ex-World War II Fairmile, Roylen Star, became the manager of the island. Another former Roylen skipper, Ray Smith, became the Assistant Manager. The resort developed quickly with the aid of the Roylen Cruise fleet, operating a system called Cruise n Stay, by utilising both vessels and the accommodation at the Island.

A small railway was introduced to run stores and supplies from the "Deep Water Jetty" to the resort. Due to the huge tidal differences (up to 6 metres or so) the jetty at the resort could only be utilised at certain times due to the depth of the water, whereas the "Deep Water Jetty" could be used around the clock.

An engineering feat during its day saw an airstrip built on the island in 1965 which operated TAA aircraft including (during the 1970s) De Havilland Twin Otters. It was, however, a relatively short airstrip and several aircraft had accidents there including one of TAA's Twin Otters. No one was killed in any of the accidents there. 

There were several cyclones over this period and the island suffered considerable damage.

In the late '80s the island's owners started demolishing villa style accommodation and constructed a new upmarket block referred to as the "Blue Lagoon" block. In 1985, Trans Australia Airlines purchased Brampton Island, upgraded the resort and subsequently sold it to P&O Resorts in late 1997. Three million dollars was spent on a major refurbishment of the resort before it was purchased by Voyages.

Celia Douty murder

On 1 September 1983, British resort worker Celia Douty was murdered in Dinghy Bay on Brampton Island. The crime remained unsolved until 2001, when it became the first murder in Australia to be solved using DNA profiling.

Light plane crash

On 3 April 2008, a single-engine Piper Cherokee crashed into the ocean just after taking off from Brampton Island. The pilot and four passengers survived and were rescued by helicopter.

Land use

National park

Most of the island is part of Brampton Islands National Park, which is home to a range of wildlife and plants. There are also 17.8 km of walking tracks and a campsite, which requires a permit to use.

Resort
The Brampton Island Resort accommodates up to 220 guests in 106 rooms and is popular with couples. The resort offers a number of free and paid-for activities, including fishing trips, snorkelling and scenic flights.

The resort was operated by Voyages until 2010 when it was sold to Brampton Enterprises. In November 2010, Brampton Enterprises announced a major redevelopment of the resort which would involve closing the resort from 24 January 2011, with an expected reopening in December 2011. However, the resort did not reopen.

The resort has fallen into disrepair and is no longer used although a walking track is accessible from the beach to the lookout.

See also

 List of islands of Australia

References

External links

 Brampton Islands National Park.

Islands of Queensland
Whitsunday Islands